Lapio is a town and comune in the province of Avellino, Campania, southern Italy.

Lapio includes the frazioni of Casale Monaci, Case sparse, Cerreto, Cortejoanna, Crete, Fortuna, Tognano, and Arianiello.

References

Cities and towns in Campania